We Need Girlfriends is an 11-episode comedy web series.

Background
The series was created by Steven Tsapelas, Angel Acevedo and Brian Amyot. It was produced by their Astoria, New York based film production company Ragtag Productions.

The series chronicles the lives of Tom, Rod and Henry. After college, the three friends move into an apartment together and are all simultaneously dumped by their girlfriends.

The series was then picked up for possible development for a television version of We Need Girlfriends for Sony Pictures and CBS, to be executive produced by Darren Star, Dennis Erdman and Clark Peterson. The project was eventually canceled.

Episode list
The web series premiered on November 1, 2006 and the season finale aired on YouTube on September 16, 2007.

Cast
 Tom - Patrick Cohen
 Henry - Seth Kirschner
 Rod - Evan Bass

References

External links
 Official We Need Girlfriends website
 
 Steven Tsapelas' YouTube channel (We Need Girlfriends web series season 1 videos)

2006 web series debuts
2007 web series endings
American comedy web series
2000s YouTube series